Black Academy may refer to:

 The Black Academy, a Canadian organization for the recognition of talent and fostering of African Canadians; founded by Stephan James and Shamier Anderson.
 Black Academy of Arts and Letters, a U.S. organization for the recognition of talent and promotion of African Americans.
Black Academy of Music, an academy for the study of Black American music, founded by Joe Brazil.
 Black Academy Press, an African-American-owned academic publisher, founded by Sebastian Okechukwu Mezu.
 Black Academy Review: Quarterly of the Black World, a quarterly journal concerning black colonization and the black diaspora, published by Black Academy Press.

References

See also

 Black River Academy, Ludlow, Vermont, USA; a historic school building
 Black Forest Academy, Kandern, Germany; a private middle and high school
 Black (disambiguation)